Broken & Beautiful  may refer to:
 Broken & Beautiful (Kate Alexa album), 2006
 Broken & Beautiful (Mark Schultz album), 2006
 Broken & Beautiful (Suzie McNeil album), 2007
 "Broken & Beautiful" (song), 2019, by Kelly Clarkson